Herts/Middlesex 5 was a tier 13 English Rugby Union league that was organized by the London and South East Division Rugby Football Union.  It was the fifth division competition for clubs in Hertfordshire and parts of north-west London that traditionally belonged to the historic county of Middlesex.  The league was split into two regional divisions - Herts/Middlesex 5 North and Herts/Middlesex 5 - with promoted teams moving up to Herts/Middlesex 4 and there was no relegation as it was the lowest level in the region.  Herts/Middlesex 5 only lasted one season before being discontinued, with all teams being transferred into Herts/Middlesex 4.

Original teams
When the division was created in 1996 it contained the following teams in two regional divisions:

Herts/Middlesex 5 North
Cuffley - transferred from Hertfordshire 1 (9th)
Hatfield - transferred from Hertfordshire 1 (11th)
Millfield Old Boys - N/A
Old Streetonians - N/A
Old Tottonians - transferred from Middlesex 3 (6th)
QEII Hospital - transferred from Hertfordshire 1 (10th)
St. Nicholas Old Boys - transferred from Middlesex 3 (5th)

Herts/Middlesex 5 South
British Airways - transferred from Middlesex 3 (10th)
GWR - transferred from Middlesex 4 (5th)
Meadhurst - transferred from Middlesex 4 (4th)
Middlesex Hospital - transferred from Middlesex 4 (runners up)
Northolt - transferred from Middlesex 3 (8th)
Orleans FP - transferred from Middlesex 3 (9th)
Osterley - transferred from Middlesex 4 (6th)
Quintin - transferred from Middlesex 3 (8th)

Herts/Middlesex 5 honours

Number of league titles

Millfield Old Boys
Northolt (1)

See also
London & SE Division RFU
Hertfordshire RFU
Middlesex RFU
English rugby union system
Rugby union in England

Notes

References

Defunct rugby union leagues in England
Rugby union in Hertfordshire
Rugby union in Middlesex